Fyodorovskoye is a rural locality (a village) in Pershinskoye Rural Settlement, Kirzhachsky District, Vladimir Oblast, Russia. The population was 875 as of 2010. There are 11 streets.

Geography 
Fyodorovskoye is located on the right bank of the Kirzhach River, 6 km south of Kirzhach (the district's administrative centre) by road. Kirzhach is the nearest rural locality.

References 

Rural localities in Kirzhachsky District